Sixteen ships of the Royal Navy have been named HMS Success, whilst another was planned:

  was a 34-gun ship, previously the French ship Jules. She was captured in 1650, renamed HMS Old Success in 1660 and sold in 1662.
She was renamed HMS Success in 1660 and was wrecked in 1680.
  was a 6-gun fireship purchased in 1672 that foundered in 1673.
  was a store hulk purchased in 1692 and sunk as a breakwater in 1707.
  was a 10-gun sloop purchased in 1709 that the French captured in 1710 off Lisbon.
  was a 24-gun storeship launched in 1709, hulked in 1730, and sold in 1748. 
  was a 20-gun sixth rate launched in 1712, converted to a fireship in 1739, and sold in 1743.
  was a 14-gun sloop launched in 1736; her fate is unknown.
  was a 24-gun sixth rate launched in 1740 and broken up in 1779.
  was a 14-gun ketch launched in 1754. Her fate is unknown.
  was a 32-gun fifth rate launched in 1781 that the French captured in 1801 but that the British recaptured the same year. She became a convict ship in 1814 and was broken up in 1820.
  was a 3-gun gunvessel, previously in use as a barge. She was purchased in 1797 and sold in 1801 for £100.
  was a 28 gun sixth rate launched in 1825, and captained by James Stirling in his journey to Western Australia. She was used for harbour service from 1832 and was broken up 1849.
 HMS Success was to have been a wood screw sloop. She was ordered but not laid down and was cancelled in 1863.
  was a  launched in 1901 and wrecked in 1914.
 HMS Success was an  launched in 1918. She was transferred to the Royal Australian Navy in 1919 and was sold in 1937.
  was an S-class destroyer launched in 1943. She was transferred to the Royal Norwegian Navy later that year and renamed . She was broken up in 1959.

See also
 , two ships of the Royal Australian Navy.

Citations and references
Citations

References
 

Royal Navy ship names